Dortmund-Germania station is a railway station in the Dortmund district of Marten in the German state of North Rhine-Westphalia. It was named Lütgendortmund (now used for a different station) and renamed Dortmund-Germania after the nearby Zeche Germania, a former colliery, on 29 May 1988. It is classified by Deutsche Bahn as a category 6 station and was opened on 30 August 1987 on a new line completed between Dortmund-Dorstfeld and Germania on 3 June 1984 and electrified between Dortmund-Marten Süd and Germania on 28 August 1987.

It is served by Rhine-Ruhr S-Bahn line S 4 at 30-minute intervals (15-minute intervals in the peak between Dortmund-Lütgendortmund and ). It is served by bus routes 440 (Oespel - Barop - Hörde - Aplerbeck), every 20 minutes), 462 (Lütgendortmund – Bövinghausen – Kirchlinde – Huckarde + Marten - Barop), every 20 minutes), 463 (Lütgendortmund – Volksgarten + Marten), every 60 minutes) and 470 (Mengede –  Westerfilde – Lütgendortmund  + Kley – Oespel (– 440 Barop)), every 20 minutes), operated by DSW21.

References

S4 (Rhine-Ruhr S-Bahn)
Rhine-Ruhr S-Bahn stations
Railway stations in Dortmund
Railway stations in Germany opened in 1987
1987 establishments in West Germany